There are many national or international dance organizations around the world, including governing bodies, teaching associations and examination boards.

Organisations covering multiple dance styles 
Aboriginal Islander Dance Theatre, Australia (defunct)
Australian Dance Council
British Association of Teachers of Dance
bbodance (formerly the British Ballet Organisation) - musical theatre, ballet, jazz, tap, modern
CDMT (Council for Dance, Drama and Musical Theatre), UK
Dancewave, Brooklyn, New York City
Imperial Society of Teachers of Dancing, UK - ballet, modern, theatre, national dance, Greek dance, Classical Indian, ballroom, sequence, disco
International Dance Teachers Association, UK
International Dance Council, part of UNESCO, based in Paris, France
National Aboriginal Islander Skills Development Association, Australia
National Dance Alliance (NDA)
National Dance Association (defunct)
National Dance Education Organization, Maryland, US
One Dance UK
TANEČNÍ SVAZ ČR
UKA Dance
Universal Dance Association (UDA)

Organisations for specific dance styles

Folk dancing
Country Dance and Song Society

Ballet/contemporary/jazz

American Dance Guild
Royal Academy of Dance

Ballroom (including dancesport) 

British Dance Council
Canadian Amateur DanceSport Association
English Amateur Dancesport Association
European Tournament for Dancing Students
Swedish Dancesport Federation
World Dance Council
World DanceSport Federation

Country and western
United Country Western Dance Council

Rock'n'roll, modern jive, swing
World Rock'n'Roll Confederation

See also
List of dance companies

Dance
 
Organizations